Brentor is a village in West Devon, England. Its population in 2001 was 423. The village is dominated by the hill of Brent Tor, topped by the village's church.

The origins of the name Brentor are old Devonian, a Brythonic Celtic language related to Cornish, Welsh and Breton and spoken in Devon until the early Middle Ages 'Bryn' and 'tor' meaning 'hill of the rock tower'. There is a farm near Brentor, which is named Brinsabach, from 'Bryn' and 'bach', meaning 'small hill' (named after the Tor).

The village used to be part of Tavistock Hundred. Brentor railway station served the village. The topographer William Crossing was for part of his life resident at Brentor. Burnville House (or Farm) was built in about 1800 and is listed on the English Heritage Register

External links
Brentor Village
Brentor community page
Brentor at GENUKI

Villages in the Borough of West Devon